The Ager is a river in Upper Austria; it is the discharge of the Attersee between Schörfling am Attersee and Seewalchen, and by Lambach it flows into the Traun.

The Ager emerged towards the end of the Würm glaciation, when the mighty glaciers began to melt.

Influx into the Ager:
The Fornacher Redlbach flows into the Ager west of Vöcklamarkt
The Vöckla flows into the Ager by Vöcklabruck
The Aurach flows into the Ager by Wankham

Over the Attersee the Ager also receives water from the Mondsee, the Irrsee (also called Zeller See), and the Fuschlsee, that are all connected by relatively short streams.

In the postwar period, the Ager was strongly polluted by various nearby factories. Today this is less the case because several sewage treatment plants have been created.

References

External links

Rivers of Upper Austria
Rivers of Austria